David Ashley Connell (born 7 September 1955) is an Australian cinematographer with a career of over 25 years of cinematographic work in films and television to date.

Career
Connell got his first Super 8 film camera at the age of 12, given to him by his father, sparking an interest in film. In 1972, at the age of 17, Connell became a camera assistant for an Australian news channel. Connell joined Crawford Productions the next year, where he became a camera loader and focus puller, and joined the Australian Cinematographers Society in 1988.

He currently resides in Brighton, Victoria, Australia with his wife Anne.

Filmography

Film
 King of the Islands (1973)
 Another Winter in Melbourne (1975)
 The Aviator (1985)
 Fortress (1985)
 Frog Dreaming (1986) (replaced Russell Hagg) (with John R. McLean)
 Slate, Wyn & Me (1987)
 Les Patterson Saves the World (1987)
 Boulevard of Broken Dreams (1988)
 The Loco-Motion (1988 music video) (with Brett Anderson)
 What the Moon Saw (1990)
 Heaven Tonight (1990)
 The NeverEnding Story II: The Next Chapter (1990) (credited as Dave Connell)
 Hunting (1991) (with Dan Burstall)
 Fifty/Fifty (1992)
 Over The Hill (1992)
 Secrets (1992)
 Female Misbehavior (1992) (with Ross Berryman, Elfi Mikesch, and Steven C. Brown)
 Gross Misconduct (1993)
 Hercules Returns (1993)
 The Ascent (1994)
 Robinson Crusoe (1997)
 Zeus and Roxanne (1997)
 The Night Flier (1997)
 The Snow Walker (2003)
 News for the Church (2004)
 Left Behind: World at War (2005)
 December Boys (2007)
 Jack and Jill vs. the World (2008)
 Ivanov Red, White, and Blue (2013)
 Bad Samaritan (2018)
 A Gift From Bob (2020)

Television
 Australia's Hidden Wealth (1982)
 Carson's Law (1982)
 Der schwarze Bumerang (1982) (with Peter W. Tost)
 All the Rivers Run (1983)
 The Flying Doctors (1985) (with Greg Ryan)
 Alice to Nowhere (1986)
 Sword of Honour (1986)
 Nancy Wake (1987)
 Bushfire Moon (1987)
 Barracuda (1988)
 Trouble in Paradise (1989)
 Rose Against the Odds (1991)
 Halfway Across the Galaxy - And Turn Left (1992)
 Lies and Lullabies (1993)
 Rio Diablo (1993)
 Between Love and Hate (1993)
 My Name Is Kate (1994)
 A Day in the Life of Country Music (1993)
 The Only Way Out (1993)
 The Yearling (1994)
 Buffalo Girls (1995)
 Silver Strand (1995)
 Shadow-Ops (1995)
 An Unfinished Affair (1996)
 Twilight Man (1996)
 Bad Day on the Block (1997)
 Clover (1997)
 Forbidden Territory: Stanley's Search for Livingstone (1997)
 Moby Dick (1998)
 Two for Texas (1998)
 Stephen King's Storm of the Century (1999)
 Witch Hunt (1999)
 Cleopatra (1999)
 Chameleon II: Death Match (1999)
 Don Quixote (2000)
 Hell Swarm (2000)
 The Monkey King (2001)
 Rose Red (2002)
 Disappearance (2002)
 Mark Twain's Roughing It (2002)
 Sniper 2 (2002)
 La Femme Musketeer (2004)
 Kingdom Hospital (2004)
 Icon (2005)
 Left Behind: World at War (2005)
 The Triangle (2005)
 Jericho (2006)
 The Lost Room (2006)
 Cane (2007)
 Leverage (2008-2012)
 The Verdict (2008)
 The Librarian: Curse of the Judas Chalice (2008)
 The Quickening (2010)
 Brain Trust (2011)
 Hound Dogs (2011)
 Scent of the Missing (2011)
 Untitled Bounty Hunter Project (2013)
 Crisis (2014)
 The Librarians (2014-2018)
 Rush Hour (2016) (Episode: Pilot)
 Dolly Parton's Heartstrings (2019)

Awards
 1987: CableACE Award for Direction of Photography and/or Lighting Direction for a Dramatic or Theatrical Special/Movie or Miniseries — Fortress (1986) (won)
 1988: AACTA Award for Best Achievement in Cinematography — Boulevard of Broken Dreams (1988) (nominated)
 1989: CableACE Award for Direction of Photography and/or Lighting Direction for a Dramatic or Theatrical Special/Movie or Miniseries — Bushfire Moon (1986) (won)
 1996: CableACE Award for Cinematography in a Movie or Miniseries — Twilight Man (1996) (nominated)
 1999: ACS Award of Distinction for Telefeatures, TV Drama & Mini Series — Moby Dick (1998) (won)
 2006: ACS Award of Distinction for Features — The Snow Walker (2003) (won)

References

External links

1955 births
People from Melbourne
Living people
Australian cinematographers